Jesus Cristo Basquetebol, also known as Jesus Christ Basketball, is an Angolan basketball team based in Luanda. The team was founded in 2021 and entered the top flight Angolan Basketball League in the 2021 season. The team's name was chosen because the team mainly consists of Catholic players.

In their debut season, Jesus Cristo finished in the 9th and last place.

Season by season

References 

Basketball teams in Angola
Basketball teams established in 2021
Sport in Luanda
2021 establishments in Africa